Margareta Wechsler "Medi" Dinu ( – July 18, 2016) was a Romanian classical painter of Jewish origin.

Early life
Margareta Wechsler Dinu was born in Brezoi, Vâlcea County, the daughter of a Jewish accountant, Daniel Wechsler, and a violin player, Amalia Hirschfeld.

Due to the rise in power of the Iron Guard, at the age of 8, she was forced to leave her hometown of Brezoi and in the next few years lived in several cities: Bucharest, Târgoviște, Cluj, Oradea, Râmnicu Vâlcea. She was spared deportation due to her father's veteran status. Medi pursued her studies, graduated from the bourgeois "Choisi Mangru" high-school in Bucharest and learned to speak in four languages: Romanian, German, Hungarian and French. Encouraged by her arts teacher, painter Costin Petrescu, she continued her studies at the Academy of Belle Arte, under Ipolit Strâmbu and Jean Alexandru Steriadi. At the same time, she studied at the Faculty of Mathematics under Dan Barbilian and the Faculty of Philosophy under Dimitrie Gusti and Nae Ionescu.

Career
Dinu debuted in 1932 at the "Official Salon of White and Black" exhibition in Bucharest, with a self-portrait. She joined the Syndicate of Artists a year later, which enabled her to travel to Balchik, a meeting place of the (mostly Jewish) avant-garde artists of the time.
Between 1934 and 1939, she visited the city of Balchik on several occasions and completed a number of works, befriending personalities such as Victor Brauner, Gellu Naum, Sașa Pană, Geo Bogza. Here, she also met poet Gheorghe Dinu, who became her husband. In 1939, the mayor of Balchik, Octavian Moşescu, invited Dinu to exhibit her works alongside other artists in the city's school.

After the Second World War, Dinu was prohibited by the authoritarian Romanian Communist Party from publishing her works and began working as a school teacher at a Jewish school in Bucharest.

Between 1940 and 1986, she traveled and worked in various cities in Romania, Bulgaria and France. Her work remained largely unknown until 2003, when she returned to her artistic life and took part in the "Senior contemporary painters of Romanian" exhibition in Bucharest, receiving critical acclaim.

In 2008, Dinu created two exhibitions at the Museums of Art in Constanța and Tulcea, donating a part of her works to these institutions. In January 2009, at her centenarian anniversary, the National Foundation for Sciences and Art of the Romanian Academy hosted a retrospective exhibition of her works.

In 2010, she was awarded the "Victor Brauner Trophy" by the Niram Art Publishing House in Madrid.

In 2016, on International Women's Day, Dinu's works from various periods were displayed as part of the exhibition "Ages of Youth" at the "House of Arts" Cultural Center in Bucharest.

Dinu's works can be found at the municipal Museums of Art of Constanța, Tulcea, Râmnicu Vâlcea; at the Metropolitan Library "Mihail Sadoveanu", at Eminescu's Memorial in Ipotești and private collections.

Artistical style

The body of her work includes pencil drawings and paintings (water colors or oil) depicting portraits, nature or marine landscapes. Her work belongs to the classical style and can be described as lyrical figurative art, en plein air, almost mathematical in simplicity, nature being stripped down to its essentials.

Even though she worked and befriended various personalities of the Romanian interbellum avant-garde, she did not approve nor understand their movement, claiming that it was disconnected from the past.

Death

Dinu died on July 18, 2016, at the age of 107, at a Jewish nursing home in Bucharest. In regards to her age, at 101, she remarked that "maybe that's why God gave me so many years, to tell small things which have not been passed down."

References

External links
Gallery of works – wikiart.org
Niram Art Awards: Medi Dinu - video includes interview in Romanian with the artist (with Spanish subtitles) and slideshow of her works

1909 births
2016 deaths
Romanian Jews
Romanian centenarians
Romanian painters
Romanian avant-garde
People from Vâlcea County
Women centenarians
Romanian women painters